The Second All-Russian Congress of Soviets of Workers' and Soldiers' Deputies was held on November 7–9, 1917, in Smolny, Petrograd. It was convened under the pressure of the Bolsheviks on the All-Russian Central Executive Committee of the First Congress of Soviets of Workers' and Soldiers' Deputies.

Background

During the autumn of 1917, the Russian Social Democratic Labor Party (Bolsheviks) launched an activity to win a majority in the Soviets, primarily in Petrograd and Moscow.

On September 17, Bolshevik Viktor Nogin was elected Chairman of the Moscow Council Presidium; on September 20, Lev Trotsky was elected Chairman of the Petrograd Council. The Bolsheviks occupy up to 90% of the seats in the Petrograd Soviet and up to 60% in the Moscow Soviet.

As early as the end of September 1917, the Bolsheviks set a course for the conquest of the majority in the All-Russian Soviet organs, for which it was necessary to obtain a majority at the corresponding congresses of the soviets.

The decision to hold the Second All-Russian Congress of Soviets of Workers' and Soldiers' Deputies in September was made by the First Congress, but the All-Russian Central Executive Committee sabotaged its meeting, not wanting to yield power to the strengthened Bolsheviks. At the end of September, the executive committee of the Bolshevik Petrograd Soviet sent to 69 local Soviets and army soldiers' committees a request their attitude towards the convocation of the Second Congress. This idea was met with hostility by the Socialist Revolutionaries and Mensheviks. Of the 69 organs requested, only 8 responded positively. The reaction of the Socialist Revolutionary-Menshevik army committees, which recognized the convocation of the Congress "untimely", was particularly harsh.

The Bolshevization of the Soviets took place against the background of an aggravated political and military situation: the Provisional Government, after long delays, finally called elections to the Constituent Assembly for November 12, and its first meeting – for November 28.

The situation at the front during this period also deteriorated greatly: on October 16, an order was issued for the evacuation of Revel, on October 21, the Germans captured the Moonsund Islands, threatening Petrograd directly.

The General Rehearsal of the Second Congress for the Bolsheviks was the First Congress of the Soviets of the Northern Region organized by them in October, the lion's share of whose delegates were representatives of Petrograd and the Baltic Fleet, which were significantly Bolshevik by that time. As Richard Pipes claimed, this Congress was convened with a number of violations by the unrecognized Regional Committee of the Army, Navy and Workers of Finland. Among the delegates were even representatives of the Moscow province, not included in the Northern region. The Bolsheviks and the Left Social Revolutionaries sharply prevailed in the Congress. Following its results, the Bolshevik-Left Socialist Revolutionary Northern Regional Committee was elected, starting from October 16, began work on the convocation of the Second Congress.

All this activity of the Bolsheviks was in no way coordinated with the old Soviet bodies, the majority of which remained Socialist Revolutionary-Menshevik (the All-Russian Central Executive Committee of the First Congress of the Soviets of Workers' and Soldiers' Deputies, the All-Russian Central Executive Committee of the First Congress of Soviets of Peasant Deputies), army committees, the Central Executive Committee of the Navy.

On October 19, the official Soviet newspaper Izvestia noted that 

Nevertheless, the All-Russian Central Executive Committee agreed to convene a Congress, having achieved only its postponement from October 20 to October 25.

Preparation of the Congress was the reason for the differences between Lenin and Trotsky. While Lenin demanded to start an armed uprising, not waiting for the Congress, Trotsky managed to convince the majority of the Central Committee to postpone the uprising until the beginning of its convocation. According to Richard Pipes, this strategy turned out to be "more realistic": the establishment of Bolshevik power was "disguised" as the seizure of power by non-partisan Soviets.

According to the description of Trotsky himself,

Chronicle of the Congress

The second congress held two plenary sessions.

Plenary Session of November 7, 1917 

The first session of the congress ran from 10:45 pm on November 7 (OS:October 25) to 6 am on November 8 (OS: October 26) of 1917.

The congress was opened by the Menshevik Dan on November 7 at 10:45 pm, at the height of the armed uprising that began in Petrograd; the opening session was attended by many delegates from the socialist parties coming from all over Russia, from a variety of sectors of society.

On the eve of the October Revolution there were 1429 Soviets of workers, soldiers and peasants' deputies. At the congress, a total of 402 Soviets of Russia, out of all the 1,429 mentioned, were represented in the Congress:
195 united Soviets of Workers' and Soldiers' Deputies
119 Soviets of Workers' and Soldiers' Deputies with the participation of peasant deputies representing rural farmers
46 Soviets of Workers' Deputies
22 Soviets of Soldiers and Sailors' Deputies representing the Armed Forces (army and navy)
and 1 Council of Cossack deputies, representing the socialist-inclined amongst Cossacks within Russia

According to the bureau of all factions, by the opening of the congress 649 delegates were present of which: 390 were Bolsheviks, 160 Social Revolutionaries, 72 Mensheviks, 14 United Internationalists, 6 Mensheviks-Internationalists, and 7 Ukrainian socialists. By the end of the congress, after the departure of the right-wing socialists and with the arrival of the new delegates, there were 625 delegates, of which 390 were Bolsheviks, 179 left-wing Socialist Revolutionaries, 35 United Internationalists and 21 Ukrainian socialists. Thus, the Bolshevik-Left Socialist Revolutionary coalition won about two thirds of the votes there. According to other sources, 739 deputies arrived at the congress, including 338 Bolsheviks, 211 right and left Socialist Revolutionaries and 69 Mensheviks.

The October Revolution and the work of the Congress 

At the time of the opening of the congress, the Bolsheviks already controlled the whole of Petrograd, but the Winter Palace was not yet taken. At around 6:30pm, an ultimatum was presented to the defenders of the Winter Palace under threat of shelling from the cruiser Aurora and the Peter and Paul Fortress. "Aurora" made one single shot at 9pm, just two hours later, as the congress was in session, an unmarked cannon shelling from the Peter and Paul Fortress was carried out at 11pm. At night, most of the defenders of the palace dispersed, and the place was occupied by revolutionary soldiers and sailors who tried to make a mob of law over the overthrown ministers, demanding "pin them". At 2:10 am, the ministers of the Provisional Government arrested by Vladimir Antonov-Ovseyenko were taken to the Peter and Paul Fortress. On the way, in the area of Trinity Bridge, the crowd that surrounded the ministers demanded "to cut off their heads and throw them into the Neva".

Agenda of the First Session of the 2nd ARCS 
The first meeting was divided into two parts:

– until the election of the presidium of the Congress – consists of protest speeches of moderate socialist parties against the uprising of the Bolsheviks;

– after the election of the Presidium of the Congress from the Bolsheviks and the Left Social Revolutionaries and the departure of the representatives of the Mensheviks, the Right Socialist Revolutionaries and the representatives of Bund from the Congress, the leadership of the Congress passes to the Bolsheviks.

The opening session of the congress was accompanied by a fierce political struggle in which Trotsky represented the Bolsheviks as the most capable speaker. The peasant councils and all the soldier-level committees of the army refused to participate in the activities of the congress. The Mensheviks and Socialist Revolutionaries condemned the Bolsheviks as an "illegal coup". Opponents of the Bolsheviks accused them of numerous frauds in the selection of congress delegates. On November 7, the old composition of the All-Russian Central Executive Committee also condemned the Bolsheviks, stating that

The Central Committee of the Menshevik Party condemned the October uprising, calling it "the seizure of power by the Bolsheviks by military conspiracy against the will of democracy and the usurpation of the rights of the people". Menshevik Martov ascertains the ambiguity of the situation in which his party finds itself: on the one hand, "the power created by armed soldiers' uprising, the power of one party cannot be recognized as a country and democracy", on the other "if the Bolsheviks are defeated by force of arms, the winner will be the third force that will crush us all". As Martov puts it, the Bolsheviks demonstrate "the Arakcheev understanding of socialism, and the Pugachev understanding of class struggle". Menshevik Liber at an extraordinary congress of Mensheviks on November 30 declares that "if we took power, we would have been stormed both on the right and on the left, and the power could be kept only by Bolshevik methods. And since we are not adventurers, we would have to leave power".

The reaction of the Social Revolutionaries was just as sharp. Thus, the central press organ of the Socialist Revolutionary Party, the newspaper Matter of the People, condemned the Bolshevik speech, saying that "our duty is to expose these traitors to the working class. Our duty is to mobilize all forces and stand up for the cause of the revolution".

In its last appeal before the Congress, the Council of the Republic called the new government "an enemy of the people and revolution" and condemned the arrest by the Bolsheviks among the ministers of the Provisional Government as well as the socialist ministers.

During the meeting, the delegates heard the roar of artillery; According to eyewitnesses, the Menshevik Martov started, and declared: "The civil war has begun, comrades! Our first question should be the peaceful resolution of the crisis... the issue of power is solved by a military conspiracy organized by one of the revolutionary parties...".

After the election of the presidium which would be filled by Bolshevik and Left Socialist Revolutionary members, a number of moderate socialist parties (Mensheviks, Right Socialist Revolutionaries, delegates of Bund) left the Congress in protest at the Bolsheviks uprising and boycotted it. They went to the City Council of Petrograd and formed the "Committee for Salvation of Motherland and Revolution" (it operated until November 10).

In turn, Trotsky at the first session of the Second Congress declared that "the uprising of the masses does not need justification; what happened is not a conspiracy, but an uprising. We hardened the revolutionary energy of the Petrograd workers and soldiers, we openly forged the will of the masses for an uprising, not a conspiracy, "and called the departure of the Menshevik and Socialist-Revolutionaries from the congress" as a criminal attempt to thwart the authorized representative office of the workers and soldiers in the masses with arms in hand protects the Congress and the revolution from the onslaught of counter-revolution".

From 2:40 to 3:10 on November 8 the first session of Congress went on immediate recess.

Proclamation of the downfall of the Provisional Government 

At 3:10 am Lev Kamenev announced the fall of the Winter Palace and the arrest of the ministers of the Provisional Government. After this, the congress approved the appeal "To the Workers, Soldiers and Peasants of Russia" officially declaring the official overthrow of the Provisional Government and the transfer of all powers of state to the Congress at large, stating that from this day onward, "all power will now belong to the Soviets of workers, peasants and soldiers' deputies" within the territories of the Russian Republic.

Ironically, it was Kamenev himself, who had recently opposed the uprising, had to inform the Congress of Soviets about his victory. At a meeting of the Central Committee of the Russian Social-Democratic Labor Party (Bolsheviks), Kamenev remarked that "well, if you did something stupid and took power, then you need to make up a ministry".

On November 8 at 6 am the congress adjourned for the day.

Plenary Session of November 8, 1917 

The second session of the congress was held from 21:00 of November 8 (OS:October 26) to 5:15 of November 9 (OS:October 27), 1917.

At the second session of the Congress, Lenin, met with stormy applause, after informing the congress of the formation of a new government of the Soviets, read to the congress decrees on Peace and on Land. Further, Lenin proposed that the Congress should dissolve the old composition of the All-Russian Central Executive Committee, choosing instead the new composition of the All-Russian Central Executive Committee and form a provisional workers' and peasant government – the Council of People's Commissars. The congress adopted (around 10:30 pm on November 8) the Peace Decree, which contains an appeal to all the warring peoples and their respective national governments to "immediately conclude a truce", "immediately begin negotiations on a just democratic peace" without any annexations and indemnities.

The Congress adopted the Land Decree (at 2 o'clock on the afternoon of November 8), which contains the following provisions:

 about the nationalization of lands, including those owned privately, and "its circulation into the national property";
 confiscation of landlord estates and their transfer to the disposal of the land committees and county councils of peasant deputies;
 transfer of land to the use of the peasants on the principle of equalization (according to the labor or consumer norm);
 hired labor is hereby prohibited within Russia.

According to Trotsky's memoirs, it was he who coined the term "people's commissar"; later this authorship was attributed to Antonov-Ovseenko. At a meeting of the Bolshevik Central Committee on the morning of November 8, the first after the seizure of power, Vladimir Lenin, Lev Trotsky, Joseph Stalin, Ivar Smilga, Vladimir Milyutin, Grigory Zinoviev, Lev Kamenev, Jan Antonovich Berzin gathered. According to Trotsky, it was him who envisioned the term "people's commissar" and later on developed the name in which the new government will be formed, Lenin agreed, stating that "it smells of a revolution".

The Second Congress of Soviets, acting on Lenin's proposal, enacted Decree no.1 officially creating the Council of People's Commissars,  which, due to the refusal of the Left Socialist-Revolutionaries, included only Bolsheviks. Lenin was announced as its founding chairman. Trotsky became people's commissar for foreign affairs, and Stalin became commissar of minorities affairs. Due to the pressure of the executive committee of the railway union of the Vikzhel, the post of People's Commissar for Railroad Affairs was temporarily in sede vacante until it would be filled in a later time.

At the second meeting of the Second Congress of Soviets, the left Socialist Revolutionary Kamkov announced that the left-wing Socialist Revolutionary faction did not intend to leave the congress after the Mensheviks and Right-wing Socialist Revolutionaries did, but noted that "the peasantry is not the Bolsheviks, but the peasantry is the infantry of the revolution, without which the revolution must die".

According to the Decree "On the Establishment of the Council of People's Commissars" approved by the Congress, the Council of People's Commissars was formed before the Constituent Assembly was convened, and the government accountable to the Congress of Soviets and its permanent body in between its sessions, the All-Russian Central Executive Committee. It would be a provisional government that would rule until the Constituent Assembly can meet.

Among the 101 members of the new Central Executive Committee (often referred to as the All-Russian Central Executive Committee) there were 62 Bolsheviks and 29 left-wing Social Revolutionaries, 6 United Social Democrats Internationalists, 3 Ukrainian socialists and 1 Social Revolutionary Maximalist. Lev Kamenev thus became the chairman. On November 9, the Congress issued an appeal to the local Soviets with a call to "rally around the new composition of the All-Russian Central Executive Committee", the powers of the commissars of the former (Socialist Revolutionary-Menshevik) composition of the All-Russian Central Executive Committee in the armed forces (Army and Navy) and on the ground were thus dissolved, with full responsibllity falling under the new committee.

On the morning of November 9, 1917 at 5:15 in the morning, the second meeting ended and the Second All-Russian Congress of Workers' and Soldiers' Deputies' Councils, with its duty completed, officially adjourned sine die, with the ARCEC and CPC now preparing for the start of their work as the new legislature and government of Russia, awaiting the convening of the planned Constituent Assembly, beginning with elections to be held just days later.

That same day, all the arrested socialist ministers of the Provisional Government were released on parole. Some of those released soon engaged in anti-Bolshevik activities. Thus, the Minister of Food Sergei Prokopovich was released November 6, but immediately joined the anti-Bolshevik Committee for Salvation of Motherland and Revolution and became one of the main organizers of the protest demonstration of the rebel members of the Petrograd City Council against the new government.

Composition of the Presidium of the Congress
14 Bolsheviks – Vladimir Antonov-Ovseyenko, Grigory Zinoviev, Lev Kamenev, Alexandra Kollontai, Nikolai Krylenko, Vladimir Lenin (absent at the 1st meeting), Anatoly Lunacharsky, Matvei Muranov, Viktor Nogin, Alexei Rykov, David Riazanov, Ephraim Sklyansky, Pyotr Stuchka, Leon Trotsky;
7 Left Socialist Revolutionaries – Moshe Baltekaklis-Gutman, Grigory Zaks, Boris Kamkov, Vladimir Karelin, Irina Kakhovskaya, Sergey Mstislavsky, Maria Spiridonova (in absentia);
1 Ukrainian socialist – Pavel Kulinichenko

Estimates
The Second Congress of Soviets of Workers' and Soldiers' Deputies was the second most important event after the armed uprising, the event of the October Revolution of 1917 in Russia.

The congress actually solved the tasks facing the Constituent Assembly in the matter of choosing the form of power in the country. The congress formed the new composition of the All-Russian Central Executive Committee and the first composition of the Council of People's Commissars, issued a number of key decrees (Decree on Peace, Decree on Land, Decree on the Total Power of the Soviets, decree abolishing the death penalty at the front, etc.).

A well-known expert on the revolution of 1917 in Russia, Alexander Rabinovich notes:

The Socialist Revolutionary and Menshevik boycott of the Congress effectively unleashed the Bolsheviks, making the first composition of the new government 100% Bolshevik. The contemporary Nikolai Sukhanov in his fundamental work "Notes on the Revolution" mentioned with regret:

Apparently, during the October Revolution and immediately after it, the establishment of a one-party system was not yet part of the plans of the Bolsheviks. By the autumn of 1917, Lenin and Trotsky managed to put together a broad coalition of radicals – Bolsheviks, Left Social Revolutionaries, anarchists, inter-district and non-factional Social Democrats, which included Trotsky himself. The Left Social Revolutionaries took an active part in the revolution, actively supporting the Bolsheviks, including at the Congress of Soviets of the Northern Region, at the Second All-Russian Congress of Soviets of Workers' and Soldiers' Deputies, at the Peasant Congress; the Petrograd Military Revolutionary Committee, in addition to the Bolsheviks and the Left Social Revolutionaries, also included anarchists.

If the first post-October composition of the Council of People's Commissars was Bolshevik (since December 1917 – Bolshevik-Left Socialist Revolutionary), then the elected Congress of Councils of the All-Russian Central Executive Committee ("Soviet parliament") had a more diverse party composition. Although the Bolsheviks and the Left Social Revolutionaries secured a majority in advance, a fraction of the Menshevik-internationalists close to the Bolsheviks, also Ukrainian socialists, were represented in the All-Russian Central Executive Committee, there was one representative of the radical Maximalist Socialist Revolutionaries. Representatives of moderate socialists did not join the All-Russian Central Executive Committee because of their boycott.

On November 14, 1917, the All-Russian Central Executive Committee adopted a resolution "On the terms of an agreement with other parties", in which it explicitly stated that it considers the "agreement of the socialist parties desirable". The terms of such an agreement were set forth as follows:

In Soviet historiography, the Second Congress of Soviets was traditionally considered as a legitimation of the new government ("the transfer of power seized by the insurgent people into the hands of the Soviets was formalized and legally secured by the Second All-Russian Congress of Workers' and Soldiers' Deputies'"). On the other hand, unlike the Constituent Assembly, the peasant majority of the country was not represented at all at the Congress: the Second All-Russian Congress of Soviets of Peasant Deputies passed a month later and was marked by a tough struggle of the Bolshevik-Left Socialist Revolutionary coalition with the Right Social Revolutionaries.

As Richard Pipes stresses, the total representation of the Bolsheviks and the Left Social Revolutionaries at the Congress of Workers 'and Soldiers' Deputies was artificially overestimated by about two times. In addition, according to the researcher, without the help of the Left Social Revolutionaries, who positioned themselves as a peasant party, the Bolsheviks would not have been able to seize control of the Peasant Congress. However, the Left Social Revolutionaries, following the moderate socialists, refused to enter the new government.

On November 15, 1917, the All-Russian Central Executive Committee of the Workers' Soldiers and the All-Russian Central Executive Committee of the Peasant Congresses merged, after which the Left Social Revolutionaries nevertheless agreed to join the Council of People's Commissars, forming a government coalition with the Bolsheviks.

Accepted Documents
Documents of the Congress (decrees, resolutions, etc.) that were adopted at the Congress with a date and quotations:

First Plenary Session 
Workers, soldiers and peasants! (adopted at the first meeting at 5 am on November 7, 1917; "immediate truce on all fronts", "all local authority passes to the Soviets of Workers, Soldiers and Peasants' Deputies", "Long live the revolution!")

Second Plenary Session 
Abolition of the death penalty (adopted at the second session at 9 pm on November 8, "at the front");
All provincial and district councils of workers, peasant, soldier and peasant deputies (adopted at the second meeting at 10 o'clock in the evening; "All power now belongs to the Soviets", "all arrested members of the land committees are released");
From the All-Russian Congress of Soviets (taken at the second session at 10 o'clock in the evening; "measures for the immediate arrest of Kerensky");
Decree on Peace (adopted at the second meeting at 11 o'clock in the evening on November 8);
Decree on Land (adopted at the second meeting at 2 am, November 8–9);
Resolution on the pogrom movement (adopted at the second meeting at the 2nd o'clock in the morning from November 8–9; on preventing any pogroms of any kind);
Council of People's Commissars (adopted at the second meeting at 5 o'clock in the morning on November 9; "for a new form for governing the country");
To the front ("On the formation of revolutionary committees in the army") (probably, the order was made between the first and second meetings);
Cossack brothers! (time is not set; about the alliance of the Cossacks with the soldiers, workers and peasants of all Russia);
To all railway workers (time is not fixed; "measures to preserve the full order on the railways").

See also
Russian Revolution

References

External links
 Appeal of the Petrograd Military Revolutionary Committee "To the citizens of Russia!"
 Appeal of the Second All-Russian Congress of Soviets to the workers, soldiers and peasants
 Second Congress of Soviets. Leonid Katzva, History of Russia. Soviet period. (1917–1991)
 Mikhail Lifshitz. "The moral significance of the October Revolution". 1967. Collected works in three volumes. Volume 3. Moscow, "Visual Arts". 1988. 230 pages. A more complete text of the article published in the journal Kommunist, 1985, No. 4.
 Alexander Pokrovsky. First Workers' and Soldiers' Parliament of Russia The First All-Russian Congress of Workers' and Soldiers' Deputies' Soviets (June 3–24, 1917): Experience in reconstructing the list of participants; the contours of the social portrait. Executive editor Vladimir Lavrov. Moscow, 2001

Sources
 Vladimir Lenin. The Second All-Russian Congress of Workers' and Soldiers' Deputies' Councils of November 7–8, 1917. Complete Works, 5th Edition, Volume 35
 The collection of laws and orders of the government for the years 1917–1918. Moscow, 1942
 Decrees of Soviet power, volume 1, Moscow, 1957
 October armed uprising in Petrograd. Documents and materials, Moscow, 1957
 Second All-Russian Congress of Workers' and Soldiers' Deputies. Collection of documents. Moscow, Leningrad, 1928
All-Russian Congress of Soviets
November 1917 events
Russian Revolution